Rosten is a surname. Notable people with the surname include:

 Daniel Rostén (born 1977), Swedish musician
 Harvey Rosten (1948–1997), English physicist
 Irwin Rosten (1924–2010), American documentary filmmaker
 Leo Rosten (1908–1997), American humorist
 Norman Rosten (1913–1995), American poet, playwright, and novelist